Mombo is a town and commune in Cameroon.

Mombo may also refer to:

Mombo, Tanzania, a place located in the Tanga Region

See also
Mambo (disambiguation)
Mumbo (disambiguation)